Bates Island is a forested and uninhabited island located in Lake Chaubunagungamaug in Webster, Massachusetts.

References

Lake islands of Massachusetts
Islands of Worcester County, Massachusetts
Uninhabited islands of Massachusetts
Webster, Massachusetts
Islands of Massachusetts